The Rural Municipality of Spiritwood No. 496 is a rural municipality (RM) in the Canadian province of Saskatchewan within Census Division No. 16 and  Division No. 6. Located in the north-central portion of the province, it is west of the City of Prince Albert.

History 
The RM of Spiritwood No. 496 incorporated as a rural municipality on December 9, 1929. It absorbed the RM of Shell Lake No. 495. The RM of Shell Lake No. 495 was originally named the RM of Shell River No. 495 prior to November 30, 1935.

Geography 
The RM of Spiritwood No. 496 is adjacent to the RMs of Big River No. 555 to the north, Medstead No. 497 to the west, Meeting Lake No. 466 to the south, and Canwood No. 494 (formerly Thompson No. 494) to the south.

Communities and localities 
The following urban municipalities are surrounded by the RM.

Towns
Spiritwood

Villages
Shell Lake

Resort villages
Echo Bay
Big Shell

The following unincorporated communities are within the RM.

Organized hamlets
Spruce Bay

Localities
Bapaume
Capasin
Leoville
Mildred
Norbury
Penn
Ranger

The RM also surrounds the Witchekan Lake First Nation Reserves and Pelican Lake First Nation Reserves (191, 191A, 191B, 191C).

Demographics 

Government 
The RM of Spiritwood No. 496 is governed by an elected municipal council and an appointed administrator that meets on the second Tuesday of every month. The reeve of the RM is Shirley Dauvin while its administrator is Colette Bussiere. The RM's office is located in Spiritwood.

Transportation 
Rail
Big River Branch C.N.R—serves Prince Albert, Shellbrook, Clonfert, Canwood, Polwarth, Mattes, Debden, Eldred, Dumble, Bodmin, Big River.

Roads
Highway 24—serves Spiritwood and Leoville
Highway 3—intersects Highway 24 and serves Belbutte, Spiritwood and Shell Lake
Highway 793—intersects Highway 24 and serves Big River
Highway 696—intersects Highway 24 and serves Pelican Lake First Nation Indian Reserve 191B
Highway 3—runs east west here and intersects Highway 24 and serves Spiritwood and Mildred
Highway 378—runs North south here and intersects Highway 3 south of Spiritwood

See also 
List of rural municipalities in Saskatchewan

References 

Spiritwood
 
Division No. 16, Saskatchewan